Geoffrey Coe (born 29 March 1943) is a former English cricketer.  Coe was a right-handed batsman who bowled left-arm medium pace.  He was born at Earl Shilton, Leicestershire.

Coe made a single first-class appearance for Leicestershire against Cambridge University at Fenner's in 1963.  Coe wasn't called upon to bat in either of Leicestershire's innings, while with the ball he took the wickets of Edward Antrobus in Cambridge University's first-innings, and Richard Hutton in their second, bowling a total of 26 overs and conceding 77 runs for his two wickets.  Leicestershire won the match by 9 wickets.  This was his only major appearance for Leicestershire.

References

External links
Geoffrey Coe at ESPNcricinfo
Geoffrey Coe at CricketArchive

1943 births
Living people
People from Earl Shilton
Cricketers from Leicestershire
English cricketers
Leicestershire cricketers